HMS Inman (K471) was a  of the Royal Navy in commission in World War II. Originally built as the United States Navy  DE-526, she served in the Royal Navy from 1944 to 1945.

Construction and transfer
The ship was laid down as the unnamed US Navy destroyer escort DE-526 by the Boston Navy Yard in Boston, Massachusetts, on 25 September 1943 and launched on 2 November 1943. The United States transferred her to the United Kingdom under Lend-Lease on 13 January 1944; she was the last of the 78 destroyer escorts the United States transferred to the United Kingdom.

Service history
The ship was commissioned into service in the Royal Navy as HMS Inman (K571) on 13 January 1944 simultaneously with her transfer. She served on patrol and escort duty for the remainder of World War II and was decommissioned in 1945 after the conclusion of the war.

The Royal Navy returned Inman to the US Navy on 1 March 1946.

Disposal
The United States sold Inman in November 1946 to George H. Nutman, Inc., of Brooklyn, New York, for scrapping.

References

External links
 Photo gallery of HMS Inman (K571)
 uboat.net HMS Inman (K 571)

 

1943 ships
Captain-class frigates
Evarts-class destroyer escorts
Ships built in Boston
World War II frigates and destroyer escorts of the United States
World War II frigates of the United Kingdom